Phony Express is a 1943 short subject directed by Del Lord starring American slapstick comedy team The Three Stooges (Moe Howard, Larry Fine and Curly Howard). It is the 75th entry in the series released by Columbia Pictures starring the comedians, who released 190 shorts for the studio between 1934 and 1959.

Plot
The town of Peaceful Gulch is under attack by bandits and thugs. The mayor devises a plan to scare them out of town by creating a false report of the arrival of three dedicated marshals, using the picture from a wanted poster for three vagrants (the Stooges at .50 cents apiece or 3 for $1.00). Despite this, the boys are almost chased out of the town themselves after nearly poisoning the town's sheriff (Snub Pollard) who is suffering from lumbago, by concocting a miracle medicine. Marching themselves into a saloon, the leader of the thugs, Red (Bud Jamison), tries to placate them with drink and dance, but is soon informed of the ruse. Testing Curly's marksmanship, the trio successfully outwit them and escape.

The sheriff finally puts them in charge of guarding the bank, which gets robbed while their backs are turned. To avoid being hanged, the Stooges search the area, with Curly as the bloodhound. After momentarily getting sidetracked by hunting a skunk, Curly taking the hide for a hat, the Stooges eventually discover the stolen money, just as the gang returns to the cabin they stashed it in. Through a series of mishaps, Curly ends up in a stove with the money, however, as Red lights a fire inside it accidentally, the flames igniting Curly's bandolier, sending bullets flying and scattering the outlaws.

Production notes
Phony Express was filmed on March 27–31, 1943. The film title is a parody of the "Pony Express," a fast mail service that crossed the North American continent from Saint Joseph, Missouri to Sacramento, California from April 1860 to October 1861. Some of the plot and minimal stock footage would be recycled in Merry Mavericks.

This was the last Three Stooges short co-written by Monte Collins, who later died on June 1, 1951.

References

External links 
 
 
 Phony Express at threestooges.net

1943 films
1943 short films
1940s Western (genre) comedy films
The Three Stooges films
American black-and-white films
Films directed by Del Lord
Columbia Pictures short films
American comedy short films
1943 comedy films
1940s English-language films
1940s American films